Rear Admiral (Junior Grade) Arne Söderlund   is a retired South African Navy officer and author.

Early life
Admiral Söderlund was born and educated in Kimberley, South Africa where he matriculated from CBC.

Navy career
Admiral Söderlund joined the SA Navy in 1966.

In 1969 he was attached to the Argentine Navy for training aboard the Sail Training Vessel ARA Libertad and on his return served aboard mine sweepers as First Lieutenant and Type 12 frigates as Communications and later Anti-Submarine Warfare Officer.

He commanded the ship , before being assigned to the strike craft project in Israel where he commissioned the second strike craft P1562  and later ) as First Lieutenant and Operations Officer. After a four-year appointment to Chief of Staff Intelligence, he was appointed as Naval and Military Attache in London from 1994 to 1997.

Promoted Commodore (which later changed to Rear Adm (Junior Grade)) he served as Director Fleet Force Preparation when Fleet Command was formed in 1999. He retired in 2006.

Author
He co-authored the following books:
 South Africa's Navy : A Navy of the People and for the People with Chris Bennett
 Iron Fist From The Sea: South Africa's Seaborne Raiders 1978–1988 with Douw Steyn

Submarine museum
The guest of honour at the ribbon cutting ceremony was Rear Admiral (JG) Theo Honiball (Ret) who as a Lieutenant Commander was her first officer commanding. The ribbon was cut by Vice-Admiral Refiloe Johannes Mudimu, Chief of the Navy.

Naval museum
Söderlund owns and runs a Maritime Museum in his house, this is a remarkably well stocked museum and covers from 1500 through to current day Naval Warfare items, it concentrates mainly on SA Navy and the Royal Navy but also holds items from many Services. He can be contacted via Simons Town Naval Base and it is a must see museum.

Awards and decorations

References

South African admirals
Living people
People from Kimberley, Northern Cape
Year of birth missing (living people)